Mahesh Bhupathi and Leander Paes were the defending champions, but lost in the semifinals to the eventual runners-up Ellis Ferreira and Rick Leach.

Martin Damm and Jim Grabb won the title, by defeating Ferreira and Leach, 6–7, 6–2, 7–6 in the final.

Seeds
Champion seeds are indicated in bold text while text in italics indicates the round in which those seeds were eliminated.

Draw

Finals

Top half

Bottom half

References

Doubles